Alexis Georgiou (born 1 February 1990) is an Australian rules footballer who played for the Melbourne Football Club in the Australian Football League (AFL).

Career 
Georgiou was recruited by the club in the 2014 Rookie Draft, with pick #35 from the Norwood football club in the SANFL.
Alex played in the 2012 and 2013 grand finals victories for Norwood defeating West Adelaide and North Adelaide respectively. 
 He was upgraded to the senior list prior to the season and made his debut in Round 1, 2014, against .

Georgiou was delisted at the conclusion of the 2014 AFL season.

Statistics

|- style="background-color: #EAEAEA"
! scope="row" style="text-align:center" | 2014
|style="text-align:center;"|
| 41 || 7 || 0 || 0 || 34 || 37 || 71 || 24 || 10 || 0.0 || 0.0 || 4.9 || 5.3 || 10.1 || 3.4 || 1.4 || 0
|- class="sortbottom"
! colspan=3| Career
! 7
! 0
! 0
! 34
! 37
! 71
! 24
! 10
! 0.0
! 0.0
! 4.9
! 5.3
! 10.1
! 3.4
! 1.4
! 0
|}

References

External links

Alex Georgiou's profile from DemonWiki

1990 births
Living people
Melbourne Football Club players
Norwood Football Club players
Casey Demons players
Australian rules footballers from South Australia